Tabachny is a rural locality (a settlement) in Krasnooktyabrskoye Rural Settlement of Maykopsky District, Russia. The population was 2008 as of 2018. There are 52 streets.

Geography 
Tabachny is located 16 km northwest of Tulsky (the district's administrative centre) by road. Sadovy is the nearest rural locality.

References 

Rural localities in Maykopsky District